The Secret House of Death is a novel by British writer Ruth Rendell, first published in 1968.

1968 British novels
Novels by Ruth Rendell
John Long Ltd books